Rennweg station is an underground railway station on the Nuremberg U-Bahn, in Nuremberg, Germany, located on the U2.

References

Nuremberg U-Bahn stations
Railway stations in Germany opened in 1993